The West Indies cricket team toured New Zealand in February to March 1987 and played a three-match Test series against the New Zealand national cricket team which was drawn 1–1. New Zealand were captained by Jeremy Coney and the West Indies by Vivian Richards. In addition, the teams played a four-match series of Limited Overs Internationals (LOI) which West Indies won 3–0.

Test series summary

First Test

Second Test

Third Test

One Day Internationals (ODIs)

West Indies won the Rothmans Cup 3–0, with one match abandoned.

1st ODI

2nd ODI

3rd ODI

4th ODI

References

External links

1987 in West Indian cricket
1987 in New Zealand cricket
International cricket competitions from 1985–86 to 1988
New Zealand cricket seasons from 1970–71 to 1999–2000
1987